In algebraic geometry, a torus action on an algebraic variety is a group action of an algebraic torus on the variety. A variety equipped with an action of a torus T is called a T-variety. In differential geometry, one considers an action of a real or complex torus on a manifold (or an orbifold).

A normal algebraic variety with a torus acting on it in such a way that there is a dense orbit is called a toric variety (for example, orbit closures that are normal are toric varieties).

Linear action of a torus 
A linear action of a torus can be simultaneously diagonalized, after extending the base field if necessary: if a torus T is acting on a finite-dimensional vector space V, then there is a direct sum decomposition:

where
 is a group homomorphism, a character of T.
, T-invariant subspace called the weight subspace of weight .

The decomposition exists because the linear action determines (and is determined by) a linear representation  and then  consists of commuting diagonalizable linear transformations, upon extending the base field.

If V does not have finite dimension, the existence of such a decomposition is tricky but one easy case when decomposition is possible is when V is a union of finite-dimensional representations ( is called rational; see below for an example). Alternatively, one uses functional analysis; for example, uses a Hilbert-space direct sum.

Example: Let  be a polynomial ring over an infinite field k. Let  act on it as algebra automorphisms by: for 

where
  = integers.
Then each  is a T-weight vector and so a monomial  is a T-weight vector of weight . Hence,

Note if  for all i, then this is the usual decomposition of the polynomial ring into homogeneous components.

Białynicki-Birula decomposition 
The Białynicki-Birula decomposition says that a smooth algebraic T-variety admits a T-stable cellular decomposition.

It is often described as algebraic Morse theory.

See also 
Sumihiro's theorem
GKM variety
Equivariant cohomology
monomial ideal

References 

A. Bialynicki-Birula, "Some Theorems on Actions of Algebraic Groups," Annals of Mathematics, Second Series, Vol. 98, No. 3 (Nov., 1973), pp. 480–497
M. Brion, C. Procesi, Action d'un tore dans une variété projective, in Operator algebras, unitary representations, and invariant theory (Paris 1989), Prog. in Math. 92 (1990), 509–539.

Algebraic geometry
Algebraic groups